Endo's pipistrelle (Pipistrellus endoi) is a species of vesper bat that is endemic to Japan. It is found in temperate forests.

Etymology
This species was described by Japanese zoologist Yoshinori Imaizumi in 1959. He named it endoi after Kimio Endo, saying that Endo was deserving of the honor because he had "recently collected several important specimens of bats in Iwate Prefecture, including the type specimen of this species."

Description
It is similar in appearance to the Japanese house bat. The baculum, however, is different. They weigh .

Biology
This species has a sperm storage mechanism, in which the females retains sperm in the isthmus of uterine tube after mating. All sperm not stored in the isthmus is rapidly metabolized by the enzymatic secretions of uterine epithelial cells. This species mates in autumn.
Females give birth in the summer. The average litter size is unknown, but twins have been observed.  
Hibernating individuals have been encountered hibernating November through March. Rock crevices appear to be important habitat for hibernation.

Range and habitat
Of the bats that have been captured, most have been in the forest, creating the impression that it was totally dependent on forest for necessary habitat.
However, in 2006, an individual was found in a secondary forest in suburban Tokyo.

Conservation
It is listed as near-threatened by the IUCN. This designation is based on it meeting the following criteria: ongoing decline in the extent and quality of its habitat, population decline estimated at 20–30% from 2019 to 2034, and the fact that it is naturally uncommon.

References

Pipistrellus
Mammals described in 1959
Bats of Asia
Endemic fauna of Japan
Mammals of Japan
Endangered animals
Endangered biota of Asia
Taxonomy articles created by Polbot